The Maxus D90 is a Mid-size, body-on-frame sport utility vehicle produced by Chinese automaker SAIC Motor under the sub-brand Maxus since October 2017.

Overview 

The Maxus D90 was previewed by the Maxus D90 concept SUV during the 2016 Beijing Auto Show. 

The D90 debuted at the 2016 Guangzhou International Motor Show in Guangzhou, China. It is based on the T60 pick-up ladder frame chassis. 

The model comes with a 2.0-litre 20L4E TGI turbocharged petrol engine and 6 speed manual and tiptronic gearbox. It is available in 5 and 7 seater configurations and 8 trim levels It also comes with 5 different grilles called Star Style, Mesh Inlet, Light black tri-grid, Chromium tri-gate and the Mesh Inlet grille with the Maxus logo.

MG Gloster 

The MG Gloster is a rebadged version of the D90 produced by MG Motor India for the Indian market.

Powertrains

References

External links 

Official website

D90
Cars introduced in 2017
2020s cars
Mid-size sport utility vehicles
Rear-wheel-drive vehicles
All-wheel-drive vehicles
Off-road vehicles
Cars of China
Production electric cars